WACS may refer to:

 WACS-TV, television station (channel 7, virtual 25) licensed to Dawson, Georgia, United States
 West Africa Cable System, communications cable
West African College of Surgeons, a professional organisation 
 Westminster Abbey Choir School, British school for the education of boy choristers
 The What a Cartoon! Show, anthology series on Cartoon Network
 White Alice Communications System, US Air Force communications system
 World Affairs Council of Seattle, non-profit, non-partisan organization
 World Association of Chefs' Societies, global network of chefs associations

See also 
 WACs, members of the Women's Army Corps (WAC)
 WAC (disambiguation)